The Best of Randy Newman is the third compilation album by Randy Newman. This album was released by Rhino Records in 2001.

Critical reception
Stephen Thomas Erlewine of AllMusic writes "a collection like The Best of Randy Newman isn't simply welcome, it's necessary" and goes on to say "This may not be every longtime fan's choice for the very best of Randy Newman, but it does give a good sense of his genius and how far-reaching it is by featuring all those previously mentioned songs, along with many others that confirm the depth of his talent."

"Short People" peaked at No. 2 on January 28, 1978 on the Billboard Hot 100.

In 1996, "You've Got a Friend in Me" from Toy Story was nominated for Best Original Song at the Academy Awards as well as for Best Original Song at the Golden Globe Awards.

Track listing

Track information and credits taken from the album's liner notes.

References

External links
Randy Newman Official Site
Rhino Records Official Site
Warner Records Official Site
Randy Newman YouTube Official Site
 

Randy Newman albums
Rhino Records compilation albums
2001 compilation albums